Ana Julia Guido Ochoa (born 16 February 1959) is a Nicaraguan jurist who is the attorney general of Nicaragua. She is the first woman to appointed to the post.

In August 2021, she was made subject to personal sanctions by the European Union over alleged human rights violations. This froze any assets in the EU and barred her doing business with European companies or traveling to the EU.

References 

1959 births
Living people
People from Matagalpa Department
20th-century Nicaraguan lawyers
21st-century Nicaraguan women politicians
21st-century Nicaraguan politicians
21st-century Nicaraguan lawyers
Nicaraguan women lawyers